Yamaceratops is a genus of primitive ceratopsian that lived in Asia during the Late Cretaceous period in what is now the Javkhlant Formation. Initially, the rocks where it was found in were thought to be from the Early Cretaceous, but the age was reevaluated in 2009.

The type species, Yamaceratops dorngobiensis, was described by P. J. Makovicky and M. A. Norell in September, 2006. The authors consider the animal to have had an intermediate phylogenetic position between Liaoceratops and Archaeoceratops within Neoceratopia. Examination of the frill of Yamaceratops has convinced the authors that the frill was not used for display, and that the fossils "[hint] at a more complex evolutionary history for ceratopsian frills."

The genus name refers to Yama, a Tibetan Buddhist deity; the species name to the Eastern Gobi. The holotype IGM 100/1315 consists of a partial skull; other material has been found in 2002 and 2003 and has been ascribed to the genus.

A fossilized embryo found within an ornithischian eggshell from sediments where Yamaceratops is common, was in 2008 referred to this genus. However, in 2015 it was reidentified as a bird embryo.

In 2020 Minyoung Son and colleagues reported a juvenile specimen of Yamaceratops found in 2014 at the Khugenetjavkhlant ("Khugenslavkhant") locality. This probably three years old specimen, MPC-D 100/553, was described in detail in 2022.

See also
 Timeline of ceratopsian research

References

External links

 Dinosaur Mailing List announcement of the description (contains full abstract of the paper)
 Description and Image (in German)

Ceratopsians
Ornithischian genera
Late Cretaceous dinosaurs of Asia
Fossil taxa described in 2006
Taxa named by Mark Norell